The 2022 First Responder Bowl was a college football bowl game played on December 27, 2022, at Gerald J. Ford Stadium in University Park, Texas. The 13th annual First Responder Bowl, the game featured Memphis of the American Athletic Conference and Utah State of the Mountain West Conference. The game began at 2:20 p.m. CST and was aired on ESPN. It was one of the 2022–23 bowl games concluding the 2022 FBS football season. Sponsored by cleanup and restoration company Servpro, the game was officially known as the Servpro First Responder Bowl.

Teams
Based on conference tie-ins, the game was expected to feature teams from the American Athletic Conference (The American), the Atlantic Coast Conference (ACC), or the Big 12 Conference. Selected for the bowl were Memphis, of The American, and Utah State, of the Mountain West Conference. This was their eighth meeting; entering the game, the Tigers led the all-time series, 4–3.

Memphis Tigers

Memphis compiled a 6–6 record in regular-season play, 3–5 in conference play. Their season included a four-game winning streak followed by a four-game losing streak. The Tigers faced two ranked teams, losing to both Tulane and UCF. Entering this game, Memphis had been invited to a bowl game each season since 2014, including the 2021 Hawaii Bowl, which was canceled the day before kickoff.

Utah State Aggies

Utah State also recorded a 6–6 regular-season record; they went 5–3 in conference play. After starting the season 1–4, the Aggies then won five of their remaining seven games to become bowl eligible. They faced, and lost to, two ranked FBS teams, Alabama and BYU. This was the Aggies' 10th bowl appearance since the 2011 season.

Game summary

Statistics

References

First Responder Bowl
First Responder Bowl
First Responder Bowl
First Responder Bowl
Memphis Tigers football bowl games
Utah State Aggies football bowl games